Pumpkin soup is a usually 'bound' (thick) soup made from a purée of pumpkin. It is made by combining the meat of a blended pumpkin with broth or stock. It can be served hot or cold, and is a common Thanksgiving dish in the United States. Various versions of the dish are known in many European countries, the United States and other areas of North America, in Asia and in Australia. Pumpkin soup was a staple for the prisoners of war in North Vietnamese prison camps during the Vietnam War.

Squash soup is a soup prepared using squash as a primary ingredient. Squash used to prepare the soup commonly includes acorn and butternut squash.

Preparation 
Squash that has initially been separately roasted can be used in soup preparation. The roasting of squash can serve to concentrate the gourd's flavor. Squash soup can be prepared with chunks or pieces of squash and also with puréed squash. Pre-cooked, frozen squash can also be used, as can commercially prepared packets of pre-cooked frozen squash purée. Butternut squash soup may have a sweet flavor, due to the sugars present in the squash. Additional basic ingredients in squash soup's preparation can include broth, onion, cream, spices such as sage and thyme, salt and pepper. Other recipes have been known to include split peas and more exotic spices such as cumin and cinnamon. Pumpkin soup can be served hot or cold, and is a popular Thanksgiving dish in the United States.

History 
A variety of pumpkin soup originated in Haiti during their independence. Designed to be a statement to french colonists that the Haitian people could work together to create something. The traditional version of pumpkin soup is called Soup joumou.

Pumpkin "pies" made by early American colonists had more similarities to being a savory soup served in a pumpkin than a sweet custard in a crust.

Pumpkin soup was a staple for the prisoners of war in North Vietnamese prison camps during the Vietnam War.

Squash soup is a soup in African cuisine. It is a part of the cuisine of Northern Africa, and the cuisines of Mozambique and Namibia, both of which are located in Southern Africa. Squash soup is also served in other countries and is a part of other cuisines. Soup Joumou is traditionally consumed in Haiti on New Year's Day (January 1), as a historical tribute to Haitian independence in 1804.

Gallery

See also 

 List of African dishes
 List of squash and pumpkin dishes
 List of soups
 Hobak-juk
 Stuffed squash

References

Further reading 

 

African soups
Soups
Squash and pumpkin dishes
Vegetable soups
Vietnamese soups
American soups
Haitian cuisine
Thanksgiving food
Australian soups
New Zealand soups